Individual eventing equestrian at the 1998 Asian Games was held in Fort Adison Riding Club, Saraburi, Thailand from December 8 to December 10, 1998.

Schedule
All times are Indochina Time (UTC+07:00)

Results
Legend
EL — Eliminated
RT — Retired
WD — Withdrawn

References

Results
Results

External links
Results

Individual eventing